Behnam Mohammadi Stadium (Vârzeshgah-e Behman Mihemidi) is a multi-purpose stadium, located in Masjed Soleyman, Khuzestan Province, Iran. It is used mostly for football matches.  The stadium is the first modern venue in Iran, being built in 1908. It has a capacity of 8,000 people and is owned by Persian Gulf Pro League side Naft Masjed Soleyman.

References

Multi-purpose stadiums in Iran
Football venues in Iran
Buildings and structures in Khuzestan Province
Sport in Khuzestan Province